Jade Foret (born 26 September 1990) is a Belgian model whose family roots are in France. She is the wife of French businessman Arnaud Lagardère.

Biography
She is the daughter of Maïté Foret, the fourth child of a family of five. She started modelling at the young age of 12 with the Newmodels agency in 2003. At age 13, in 2004, she became famous in Belgium for a backless picture which was displayed as a gigantic poster for the Levis paint brand (100 m by 20) on the Madou Plaza Tower in Brussels. At the same age, she went on the catwalk for Armani in Italy.         

In 2009, she had a short and stormy liaison with soccer player Émile Mpenza, which concluded bitterly. She continued working as a top model and decided to move to New York. She joined the agency One Management. She also tried singing and played bit parts in films and on television.

In 2010, she met businessman Arnaud Lagardère and became his partner. They both appeared in a short making-of of a photo shoot in Lagardère's country residence in Rambouillet in July 2011 for the Belgian daily Le Soir. This video became an instant Internet phenomenon. It also led some employees from the industrial conglomerate of Arnaud Lagardère to challenge his ability to manage the group.

In May 2012, Arnaud Lagardère confirmed that the couple will marry soon and was expecting a baby in September 2012. The baby girl, Liva, was born on 16 September 2012. They married in Paris on 24 May 2013.

They have also a second daughter, Mila (born 9 March 2014) and a son, Nolan (born 16 January 2016).

Filmography
Louis la Brocante - "Louis et la belle brocante" (2008) : girl at the bar
Traceless (Sans laisser de traces) (2010) : Russian girl

Books

Graphic novels

Amber Blake series
In French
La Fille de Merton Castle (2017) with Jackson Guice - Glénat Editions - 
Opération Cleverland (2018) with Jackson Guice - Glénat Editions - 
Opération Dragonfly (2022) with Jackson Guice - Glénat Editions - 

In English
Amber Blake (compilation of La Fille de Merton Castle and Opération Cleverland) (2019) - IDW Publishing -

References

External links 
 

Belgian female models
1990 births
Living people
Belgian people of French descent
People from Woluwe-Saint-Lambert